The Daytime Emmy Award for Outstanding Children's Special was an Emmy award given to television programming aimed towards children. Television movies, dramatic specials, and non-fiction programming were all eligible. The award had been presented since the inaugural year; however, it was quietly retired after 2007.

Winners and Nominees 
Winners in bold

Outstanding Children's Entertainment Special 

1974
 ABC Afterschool Specials ("Rookie of the Year") (ABC)
 ABC Afterschool Specials ("My Dad Lives in a Downtown Hotel") (ABC)
 The Swiss Family Robinson (CBS)
1975
 The CBS Festival of Lively Arts for Young People ("Harlequinade") (CBS)
 The CBS Festival of Lively Arts for Young People ("What Makes a Gershwin Tune a Gershwin Tune?") (CBS)
 The CBS Festival of Lively Arts for Young People ("Ailey Celebrates Ellington") (CBS)
1976
 The CBS Festival of Lively Arts for Young People ("Danny Kaye's Look-In at the Metropolitan Opera") (CBS)
 The CBS Festival of Lively Arts for Young People ("What Is Noise and What Is Music?") (CBS)
 ABC Afterschool Specials ("It Must Be Love ('Cause I Feel So Dumb!)") (ABC)
 ABC Afterschool Specials ("Me and Dad's New Wife") (ABC)
 NBC Special Treat ("Papa and Me") (NBC)
1977
 NBC Special Treat ("Big Henry and the Polka Dot Kid") (NBC)
 ABC Afterschool Specials ("Francesca, Baby") (ABC)
 ABC Afterschool Specials ("Blind Sunday") (ABC)
 ABC Afterschool Specials ("P.J. and the President's Son") (ABC)
 The CBS Festival of Lively Arts for Young People ("The Original Rompin' Stompin' Hot And Heavy, Cool And Groove All Star Jazz Show") (CBS)
 NBC Special Treat ("Luke Was There") (NBC)
1978
 ABC Afterschool Specials ("Hewitt's Just Different") (ABC)
 ABC Afterschool Specials ("The Pinballs") (ABC)
 NBC Special Treat ("How The Beatles Changed The World") (NBC)
 NBC Special Treat ("A Piece Of Cake") (NBC)
 Once Upon a Classic ("Man From Nowhere") (PBS)
 Winners ("I Can") (CBS)
 Winners (Journey Together") (CBS)
1979
 NBC Special Treat ("The Tap Dance Kid") (NBC)
 ABC Afterschool Specials ("Make Believe Marriage") (ABC)
 ABC Afterschool Specials ("Mom And Dad Can't Hear Me") (ABC)
 CBS Afternoon Playhouse ("Joey And Redhawk") (CBS)
 NBC Special Treat ("Rodeo Red And The Runaway") (NBC)
 NBC Special Treat ("NYC Too Far From Tampa Blues") (NBC)
1980
 ABC Afterschool Specials ("The Late Great Me: Story of a Teenage Alcoholic") (ABC)
 Once Upon a Classic ("Chico the Rainmaker") (PBS)
 NBC Special Treat ("I Don't Know Who I Am") (NBC)
 NBC Special Treat ("The Rocking Chair Rebellion") (NBC)
 NBC Special Treat ("The House At 12 Rose Street") (NBC)
1981
 ABC Afterschool Specials ("A Matter of Time") (ABC)
 ABC Afterschool Specials ("A Family of Strangers") (ABC)
 CBS Afternoon Playhouse ("I Think I'm Having a Baby") (CBS)
 NBC Special Treat ("Sunshine's On The Way") (NBC)
1982
 ABC Afterschool Specials ("Starstruck") (ABC)
 CBS Afternoon Playhouse ("Me and Mr. Stenner") (CBS)
1983
 ABC Afterschool Specials ("The Woman Who Willed a Miracle") (ABC)
 CBS Afternoon Playhouse ("Help Wanted") (CBS)
 CBS Afternoon Playhouse ("Just Pals") (CBS)
 NBC Special Treat ("Oh, Boy! Babies!") (NBC)
1984
 ABC Afterschool Specials ("The Great Love Experiment") (ABC)
 NBC Special Treat ("He Makes Me Feel Like Dancin'") (NBC)
 ABC Afterschool Specials ("Andrea's Story: A Hitchhiking Tragedy") (ABC)
 CBS Afternoon Playhouse ("Revenge Of The Nerds") (CBS)

Outstanding Children's Informational Special 

1976
 Happy Anniversary, Charlie Brown (CBS)
 What's It All About? ("What Are The Loch Ness And Other Monster's All About?") (CBS)
 ABC Afterschool Specials ("Winning and Losing: Diary of a Campaign") (ABC)
1977
 ABC Afterschool Specials ("My Mom's Having A Baby") (ABC)
 How to Follow the Campaign (ABC)
1978
 ABC Afterschool Specials ("Very Good Friends") (ABC)
 The CBS Festival of Lively Arts for Young People ("Henry Winkler Meets William Shakespeare") (CBS)
1979
 Razzamatazz (CBS)
 The CBS Festival of Lively Arts for Young People ("The Secret of Charles Dickens") (CBS)
1980
 The CBS Festival of Lively Arts for Young People ("Why a Conductor") (CBS)
 The CBS Festival of Lively Arts for Young People ("Make 'Em Laugh: A Young People's Comedy Concert") (CBS)
1981
 The CBS Festival of Lively Arts for Young People ("Julie Andrews' Invitation to the Dance with Rudolf Nureyev") (CBS)
 On the Level ("Side by Side - Prejudice") (PBS)
1982
 Kathy (PBS)
 The Body Human ("Becoming a Woman") (CBS)
 The Body Human ("Becoming a Man") (CBS)
1984
 CBS Schoolbreak Special ("Dead Wrong: The John Evans Story") (CBS)

Outstanding Children's Anthology/Dramatic Programming 

1980
 ABC Weekend Specials ("The Gold Bug") (ABC)
 Once Upon a Classic ("Leatherstocking Tales") (PBS)
 CBS Library ("Once Upon a Midnight Dreary") (CBS)
 CBS Library ("Animal Talk") (CBS)
 ABC Weekend Specials ("The Revenge of Red Chief") (ABC)

Outstanding Children's Special 

1985
 CBS Schoolbreak Special ( "All the Kids Do It") (CBS)
 ABC Afterschool Specials ("I Want to Go Home") (ABC)
 CBS Schoolbreak Special ("The Day the Senior Class Got Married") (CBS)
 CBS Schoolbreak Special ("Hear Me Cry") (CBS)
1986
 CBS Schoolbreak Special ("The War Between the Classes") (CBS)
 ABC Afterschool Specials ("Don't Touch") (ABC)
 CBS Schoolbreak Special ("Have You Tried Talking to Patty?") (CBS)
 CBS Schoolbreak Special ("Babies Having Babies") (CBS)
1987
 ABC Afterschool Specials ("Wanted: The Perfect Guy") (ABC)
 ABC Afterschool Specials ("Supermom's Daughter") (ABC)
 ABC Afterschool Specials ("Teen Father") (ABC)
 ABC Weekend Specials ("The Mouse and the Motorcycle") (ABC)
1988
 CBS Schoolbreak Special ("Never Say Goodbye") (CBS)
 ABC Afterschool Specials ("Just a Regular Kid: An AIDS Story") (ABC)
 ABC Afterschool Specials ("The Kid Who Wouldn't Quit: The Brad Silverman Story") (ABC)
 CBS Schoolbreak Special ("What If I'm Gay?") (CBS)
1989
 ABC Afterschool Specials ("Taking a Stand") (ABC)
 ABC Weekend Specials ("Runaway Ralph") (ABC)
 CBS Schoolbreak Special ("Gangs") (CBS)
 CBS Schoolbreak Special ("No Means No") (CBS)
 CBS Schoolbreak Special ("My Past Is My Own") (CBS)
1990
 CBS Schoolbreak Special ("A Matter of Conscience") (CBS)
 ABC Afterschool Specials ("A Town's Revenge") (ABC)
 Buy Me That! A Kids' Survival Guide to TV Advertising. (HBO)
 CBS Schoolbreak Special ("Flour Babies") (CBS)
1991
 Lost in the Barrens (Disney Channel)
 Lifestories: Families in Crisis ("Gunplay: The Last Day in the Life of Brian Darling") (HBO)
 ABC Weekend Specials ("Ralph S. Mouse") (ABC)
 Tales from the Whoop ("Hot Rod Brown Class Clown") (Nickelodeon)
 The Cropp Family Nature Album (Disney Channel)
1992
 Vincent et moi (Disney Channel)
 CBS Schoolbreak Special ("Abby, My Love") (CBS)
 First Love, Fatal Love (HBO)
 Lost in the Barrens II: The Curse of the Viking Grave (Disney Channel)
 Woof! (Disney Channel)
1993
 ABC Afterschool Specials ("Shades of a Single Protein") (ABC)
 ABC Weekend Specials ("CityKids") (ABC)
 Higher Goals (PBS)
 Lifestories: Families in Crisis ("Public Law 106: The Becky Bell Story") (HBO)
 CBS Schoolbreak Special ("Words Up!") (CBS)
1994
 Lifestories: Families in Crisis ("Dead Drunk: The Kevin Tunell Story") (HBO)
 ABC Afterschool Specials ("Girlfriend") (ABC)
 Lifestories: Families in Crisis ("More Than Friends: The Coming Out of Heidi Leiter") (HBO)
 CBS Schoolbreak Special ("Other Mothers") (CBS)
 Rhythm & Jam (ABC)
1995
 Lifestories: Families in Crisis ("A Child Betrayed: The Calvin Mire Story") (HBO)
 CBS Schoolbreak Special ("The Writing on the Wall") (CBS)
 Lifestories: Families in Crisis ("POWER: The Eddie Matos Story") (HBO)
 Nick News with Linda Ellerbee ("Space Shuttle, Phone Home") (Nickelodeon)
 CBS Schoolbreak Special ("Love in the Dark Ages") (CBS)
1996
 CBS Schoolbreak Special ("Stand Up") (CBS)
 ABC Afterschool Specials ("Positive: A Journey into AIDS") (ABC)
 CBS Schoolbreak Special ("Children Remember the Holocaust") (CBS)
 Eagle Scout: The Story of Henry Nicols (HBO)
 The Song Spinner (Showtime)
1997
 Elmo Saves Christmas (PBS)
 ABC Afterschool Specials ("Miracle at Trapper Creek") (ABC)
 Lifestories: Families in Crisis ("Someone Had to be Benny") (HBO)
 Family Video Diaries ("Brett Killed Mom: A Sister's Diary") (HBO)
 Family Video Diaries ("Bubbeh Lee and Me") (HBO)
1998
 In His Father's Shoes (Showtime)
 Assignment Discovery ("The Science of HIV") (Discovery Channel)
 Bong & Donnell (HBO)
 Letters from Africa (Disney Channel)
 The Royale (AMC)
1999
 The Island on Bird Street (Showtime)
 Edison: The Wizard of Light (HBO)
 Galileo: On the Shoulders of Giants (HBO)
 The Sweetest Gift (Showtime)
 The Tiger Woods Story (Showtime)
2000
 Summer's End (Showtime)
 The Devil's Arithmetic (Showtime)
 A Gift of Love: The Daniel Huffman Story (Showtime)
 Sea People (Showtime)
 Locked in Silence (Showtime)
2001
 Run the Wild Fields (Showtime)
 A Storm in the Summer (Showtime)
 Ratz (Showtime)
 The Sandy Bottom Orchestra (Showtime)
 What Matters: 2001 Millennium Special (HBO)
2002
 My Louisiana Sky (Showtime)
 Off Season (Showtime)
 Snow in August (Showtime)
 They Call Me Sirr (Showtime)
 Walter and Henry (Showtime)
2003
 Bang Bang You're Dead (Showtime)
 Our America (Showtime)
 Table Talk ("Talking Beyond 9/11") (WAM!)
 ZOOM ("America's Kids Remember") (PBS)

Outstanding Children/Youth/Family Special 

2004
 The Incredible Mrs. Ritchie (Showtime)
 Reality Matters ("Deadly Desires") (Discovery Channel)
 The Maldonado Miracle (Showtime)
2005
 Mighty Times ("The Legacy of Rosa Parks") (HBO)
 A Separate Peace (Showtime)
2006
 Reality Matters ("Teen Sexuality") (Discovery Channel)
 Saving a Species ("Sharks at Risk") (Discovery Channel)
2007
 Saving a Species ("The Great Penguin Rescue") (Discovery Kids)
 The Great Polar Bear Adventure (Discovery Kids)
 A Year on Earth (Discovery Kids)

References 

Children's Special
Children's television awards
Awards established in 1974